Pupilla muscorum, commonly known as the Moss Chrysalis snail or widespread column, is a species of minute air-breathing land snail, a terrestrial pulmonate gastropod mollusk or micromollusk in the family Pupillidae.

Taxonomy 
A variety Pupilla muscorum var. pratensis Clessin, 1871 considered as ecophenotype of Pupilla muscorum was elevated to its species level Pupilla pratensis in 2009.

Description 
The shell is usually light brown, varies from reddish brown to horny grey, weakly striated or almost smooth, 5–6.5 weakly convex whorls, suture not very deep (deep suture is presented in Pupilla sterrii – see picture below), aperture usually with well-developed lip, cervical callus strongly developed, like a dam, parietal tooth usually present, palatal tooth sometimes too.

Pupilla muscorum differs from Pupilla pratensis with which it lives sympatrically, in its thicker, smaller and more slender shell, lighter and more variable colour and stronger apertural lip.

The animal of Pupilla muscorum is small, elliptical, dark with lighter sides and foot, upper tentacles not very long, lower tentacles very short.

Extant populations of P. muscorum are practically identical in shape to their ancestors, indicating that the have tracked their ecological niches over time.

The height of the shell is 3.0–4.0 mm. The width of the shell is 1.65–1.75 mm (shell diameter does not vary much).

Distribution
This species of land snail occurs in the Northern Hemisphere including almost all of Europe. It is recorded as present in countries and islands including:
 Great Britain. It is threatened by disturbance due to intensification of land use of old calcareous grasslands in Britain.
 Ireland
 lower concern in Austria. Vulnerable in Vorarlberg.
 lower concern in Germany, decreasing (4R) in Bavaria.
 Czech Republic
 Slovakia
 Ukraine and Crimea
 Pakistan
 Michigan, USA
 Utah, USA
 Vermont, USA

Ecology 
Pupilla muscorum lives in dry meadows, sand dunes, in open and sunny habitats. Calciphile. In Portugal it is found under stones, dead leaves and in mosses. In Britain it is frequent in sheep-grazed calcareous grasslands. In the Alps in up to 2400 m, in Bulgaria 1200 m.

Ovoviviparous, the species is able to hibernate with its eggs, and can then release eggs with partly grown embryos during more favourable seasons.

References
This article incorporates public domain text from the reference.

External links

Pupillidae
Gastropods described in 1758
Taxa named by Carl Linnaeus
Molluscs of Pakistan